Steven Thomas McGarry (born 28 September 1979) is an ex-professional Scottish footballer and former 1st team assistant coach at A-League Men side Perth Glory FC, the club McGarry last played for professionally. He joined Perth Glory in January 2010 after playing at the top level in the Scottish Premier League with St Mirren, Ross County and Motherwell.

McGarry is on the Scotland U21s Youngest Scorer list, scoring in the 1997 Toulon Tournament against the USA aged 17 years and 241 days.

In March 2018, McGarry was one of four, former St Mirren F.C. players voted by supporters to have a street named in his honour – McGarry Terrace – following a public competition run by Renfrewshire Council to name the streets at the former Love St ground being developed by Sanctuary Scotland into affordable housing.

Club career
McGarry, a midfielder who previously played for St Mirren and Ross County in Scottish Premier League and also had a loan spell at Boston United in England during his time with St Mirren. He also played for Motherwell between 2006 and 2010.

St Mirren F.C.

Ross County F.C.

Motherwell F.C.

Perth Glory FC
McGarry moved to Australian A-League team Perth Glory during the 2010 January transfer window. On 9 May 2012, he signed a one-year contract extension with the club.

In 2013 McGarry was crowned the Most Glorious Player (MGP), while also picking up the players' player of the year award and the goal of the year prize for his stunning strike in a 1–0 victory over Brisbane Roar in December.

Coaching career

Perth Glory FC
Post playing career in 2015 McGarry transitioned into Coaching Perth Glory's NYL & NPL U20's squads. McGarry rejoined the club in 2018 to take up the position of Academy Technical Director & NPL U18s Head Coach. In 2020 shortly after the departure of Tony Popovic as manager, Richard Garcia was appointed new Head Coach of the 1st team. Weeks after his appointment, McGarry was announced as his 1st Team Assistant Coach for the upcoming 2020–21 season. McGarry will still continue in his capacity as the club's Academy Technical Director in a dual-role within the club.

ECU Joondalup SC
In 2016 he accepted a position at NPL team ECU Joondalup to return to playing while also taking up the 1st team assistant & Technical Director roles.

While still Player/Coach at ECU Joondalup SC, McGarry was appointed assistant coach to Chris Coyne for the Western Australia state team.

Media
In October 2017, McGarry joined the inaugural Croc Media Expert commentary team. He has provided commentary in every A-League season since his appointment and was Expert Commentator for the blockbuster clash between English Giants Manchester United & Leeds United at Optus Stadium where they faced off in front of a crowd of 55 000 fans during their tours of Australia in 2019.

Honours

Club

St Mirren F.C.

Scottish Championship 1999–2000 Scottish First Division

Individual

St Mirren F.C.

St Mirren F.C. Young Player of the Year 1999–2000 Scottish First Division

Perth Glory FC

Perth Glory FC Most Glorious Player (MGP) 2012–13 Perth Glory FC season
Perth Glory FC Goal of the Season 2012–13 Perth Glory FC season
Perth Glory FC Players Player of the Year 2012–13 Perth Glory FC season
Perth Glory FC Golden Boot 2013–14 Perth Glory FC season

Football Australia

 McGarry is Recognised by both FFA & PFA for an Outstanding contribution to A League.

Professional Footballers Australia
 Selection for PFA Australian Legends for match vs Manchester United Legends

References

External links
 Perth Glory profile

1979 births
Living people
Scottish footballers
Scottish Football League players
Scottish Premier League players
A-League Men players
St Mirren F.C. players
Boston United F.C. players
Perth Glory FC players
Ross County F.C. players
Motherwell F.C. players
Expatriate soccer players in Australia
Scottish expatriate sportspeople in Australia
Scotland under-21 international footballers
Scottish expatriate footballers
Association football midfielders